This page lists the World Best Year Performance in the year 2008 in the men's decathlon. The main event during this season were the 2008 Olympic Games in Beijing, PR China, where the competition was held at the Beijing National Stadium on August 21 and August 22.

Records

2008 world ranking

See also
2008 Décastar
2008 Hypo-Meeting

References
decathlon2000
IAAF
apulanta

2008
Decathlon Year Ranking, 2008